Jeziernia  is a village in the administrative district of Gmina Tomaszów Lubelski, within Tomaszów Lubelski County, Lublin Voivodeship, in eastern Poland.

The village has a population of 980.  It has a beautiful park with the Grotto of our Lady, and a centrally located church - St Anthony of Padua.  There is a fire station and a primary school.  Jeziernia has a few local privately owned shops.  Jeziernia is situated in an agricultural region of Roztocze Wschodnie.

References 

Jeziernia